John Burrough (5 September 1873 – 26 December 1922) was an English first-class cricketer who played in 24 matches for Cambridge University and various amateur teams, including sides put together by W. G. Grace, between 1893 and 1914.

Burrough was born in Clun, Shropshire, son of the Rev Charles Burrough and his wife, who was born Georgina B. Long, and educated at Shrewsbury School and Jesus College, Cambridge. He became a Church of England priest and served as a Chaplain to the Forces at various locations from 1907 to 1921, including during the First World War. He died aged 49 at St Leonards, East Sussex.

His younger brother William Burrough played first-class cricket for Somerset in 1906.

References

1873 births
1922 deaths
People educated at Shrewsbury School
Alumni of Jesus College, Cambridge
Church of England priests
English cricketers
Cambridge University cricketers
Free Foresters cricketers
British Army cricketers
Gentlemen of England cricketers
People from Clun
H. D. G. Leveson Gower's XI cricketers
W. G. Grace's XI cricketers
Military personnel from Shropshire